Alburnus leobergi is a species of ray-finned fish in the genus Alburnus; it is widespread in Eastern Europe in the Sea of Azov basin. A landlocked population exists in Tsimlyansk Reservoir (Don drainage). It is a benthopelagic fish, up to 40.3 cm long.

References

Alburnus
Fish described in 2007
Taxa named by Jörg Freyhof
Freshwater fish of Europe
Fish of Russia